Richard Neale "Tuff" Hedeman (born March 2, 1963) is an American former professional rodeo cowboy who specializes in bull riding. He won the Professional Rodeo Cowboys Association (PRCA) bull riding world championship three times (1986, 1989 and 1991), as well as the 1995 Professional Bull Riders (PBR) world championship. He also won the 1993 world championship for the now-defunct Bull Riders Only (BRO) organization. He is also one of the co-founders of the PBR and is known for having been one of rodeo icons Lane Frost's closest friends. Hedeman and the infamous bucking bull Bodacious had a few historic clashes. He later served as the President of the PBR and then the President and Ambassador of Championship Bull Riding (CBR). In 2018, he formed his own bull riding organization: the Tuff Hedeman Bull Riding Tour (THBRT).

Career 
Hedeman was born in El Paso, Texas, and won many junior rodeos in his youth. In 1980, he won the high school rodeo bull riding and All Around titles in New Mexico. He won the team roping title and All Around designation again in 1981. After high school, he attended Sul Ross State University in Alpine, Texas. At Sul Ross, he was a member of the rodeo team, competing in bronc riding, team roping, steer wrestling, and bull riding.

Hedeman filled his PRCA permit at a single rodeo in 1983 as a bronc rider. He was known for riding bulls that often had not been ridden. He often traveled with fellow bull riders and close friends Lane Frost, Cody Lambert, Jim Sharp, Clint Branger, and Ty Murray to save travel expenses. He qualified for eleven National Finals Rodeos (NFRs). By 1993, he had surpassed $1 million in career earnings and won the 1986, 1989, and 1991 world titles in the PRCA. A neck injury at the NFR in 1993 kept him out of the arena for the entire year of 1994. In 1994, he was portrayed by actor Stephen Baldwin in the Hollywood feature film 8 Seconds about the life of Lane Frost. He was actually a stunt double for Baldwin.

Hedeman was instrumental in starting the Professional Bull Riders. In 1995, he won the PBR World Championship despite an encounter with Bodacious that resulted in numerous broken bones in his face. From 1993 to 1995, Bodacious had been out of competition for long periods due to an injury; however, he returned as a more dangerous animal, having developed a new bucking move "involving him bringing his rear up with his head to the ground, luring a rider to shift his weight forward, and then thrusting his head up full force, to smash the rider in the face". He was jerked down by Bodacious upon exiting the chutes, so the bull could thrust his head up and smash Hedeman’s face, shattering every major facial bone. Hedeman managed to walk out of the arena, but required several hours of reconstructive surgery for his face. He spent less than two months recuperating, and at the NFR later that year, he drew Bodacious again — this time, in round 7. At the request of his son, he decided to turn him out – getting off him when he left the chute – and received a standing ovation.

Hedeman barely missed winning a second consecutive PBR world title in 1996, losing to Owen Washburn as he came in second. He then finished third in the world during the 1997 PBR season. His last ride was at the PBR Bud Light Cup Series event in Odessa, Texas in 1998, when he landed on his head after getting thrown off and herniated a disc in his previously injured neck, which required surgery. After some consideration, he officially retired in 1999. He was leading both the PBR and PRCA World Standings in 1998 at the time of his injury.
Hedeman is one of the estimated seven to ten riders to have ever ridden Bodacious for the qualified 8 seconds, with the stand-out ride being a 95-point ride at the 1993 Bull Riders Only (BRO) World Finals in Long Beach, California.

End of career, retirement, and after 
Hedeman served as president of the PBR from 1992 to 2004 and was a commentator for televised PBR events from 1999 to 2004. In early 2005, Hedeman very briefly joined the PRCA Xtreme Bulls tour as a sideline reporter for televised events before joining CBR not long after. He was president of CBR from 2005 to 2011 and was a commentator for televised CBR events from 2005 to 2008. He remained with said organization as ambassador and chute-boss from 2011 to early 2018. In early 2018, Hedeman left CBR (which folded later that same year) to start his own organization: the Tuff Hedeman Bull Riding Tour (THBRT).

Personal life 
Hedeman lives on a ranch in Morgan Mill, Texas, outside of Fort Worth. His oldest son, Lane, is named after Lane Frost; his younger sons are Trevor, Ryker and Ripp. He spends his free time traveling to bull riding and team roping events. He married Elizabeth Ann in 2021.

Awards 
 1986, 1989, 1991 PRCA Bull Riding World Champion
 1987, 1989 NFR Bull Riding Average Champion
 1993 First $1,000,000 Bull Rider
 1995 PBR Touring Pro Division Champion
 1995 PBR World Champion

Honors 

 1988 Cowboy Capital Walk of Fame
 1997 ProRodeo Hall of Fame
 1997 El Paso Athletic Hall of Fame
 1999 PBR Ring of Honor
 2002 Texas Cowboy Hall of Fame
 2003 Cheyenne Frontier Days Hall of Fame
 2010 Texas Rodeo Cowboy Hall of Fame
 2016 Bull Riding Hall of Fame
 2017 Molalla Walk of Fame
 2020 Rodeo Hall of Fame of the National Cowboy & Western Heritage Museum

References

External links
 Tuff Hedeman Bull Riding Tour
 Tuff Hedeman TV

1963 births
Living people
People from El Paso, Texas
People from Fort Worth, Texas
Ranchers from Texas
Sul Ross State University alumni
Bull riders
ProRodeo Hall of Fame inductees
Sportspeople from Texas
Professional Bull Riders: Heroes and Legends